Ranka parish is an administrative unit of Gulbene Municipality (prior to the 2009 administrative reforms Gulbene District). It is located in a hilly region with land use consisting mainly of agriculture and forests.

Towns, villages and settlements
Hamlets in the Ranka parish are:
Sprogi
Birzuli
Kakupi
Lacumeri
Vecamuiza
Pavarini
Dukuli
Augstkalni
Pluksi
Papani
Kartonfabrika
Ranka
Salina
Branti
Lacites
Sejatas
Lukes
Reveli
Kezi
Mezsiliesi

Lakes
In Ranka parish are several lakes, including:
Kalmodu ezers
Cepļu ezers
Teļezers

Transport
The regional roads P33 and P27 run through Ranka.

Ranka has 2 railway stations: Uriekste and Ranka.

References 

Parishes of Latvia
Gulbene Municipality